Utsira Lighthouse is a coastal lighthouse in Rogaland county, Norway.  It sits on the western side of the island of Utsira in the municipality of Utsira.

History
The lighthouse was first lit in 1844, and listed as a protected site in 1999. The twin lighthouses were used to distinguish it from other nearby lighthouses, but the other lighthouse was decommissioned in 1890. Since 2008, one of the lighthouse keeper's buildings has served as a tourist cabin.

At the top, there is a 1st order Fresnel lens which emits three white flashes every 60 seconds.

See also

Lighthouses in Norway
List of lighthouses in Norway

References

External links

 Norsk Fyrhistorisk Forening 

Lighthouses completed in 1844
Lighthouses in Rogaland
Listed lighthouses in Norway
Tourist huts in Norway
Utsira
1844 establishments in Norway